Variety Wholesalers, Inc., is a privately held company based in Henderson, North Carolina, which owns more than 380 retail stores in the Southeast and Mid-Atlantic United States under the banners Roses and Maxway.  The company employs more than 7,000 workers.

History
It originated in 1930 as a small group of retail stores owned by the Pope family.  In 1949, John William Pope took over the family business, and starting in 1970, the company expanded by purchasing a number of other retail chains, including the Roses and Maxway stores, to become one of the largest in the US.

The company is still privately owned by the Pope family, and its current CEO is Art Pope.

Organization 
The Company has three main divisions:

Maxway stores, which consists of 135 stores in the "junior department store" competitive market. The size of the store ranging from 10,000 square feet to 30,000 square feet and operate  under the Maxway and Roses Express names

Super 10 consists of 85 stores. Their size ranges from 5,000 to 10,000 square feet. These stores operate under the names "Super Dollar," "Bill's Dollar Stores," "Super 10", and "Bargain Town"
 
Roses stores have 160 locations and are competitive with "discount" and "off-price" stores. These range in size from 30,000 square feet to 70,000 square feet.

External links
Variety Wholesalers corporate website

References

Privately held companies based in North Carolina
American companies established in 1930
Retail companies established in 1930
Variety stores
Discount stores of the United States
1930 establishments in North Carolina